Eddy Hartono Arbie (born 19 July 1964) is an Indonesian former badminton player who excelled in the late 1980s and early 1990s. After a brief stint competing in singles, he soon became a doubles specialist noted for his deft racket control and fluent strokes. His two siblings, Hastomo and Hariyanto  were world class shuttlers in men's singles.

Career 
Hartono affiliated with PB Djarum since 1976. He won the Indonesia junior national championships in 1981, and selected to join national team in 1983. He started his career in national team as singles player, and after two years he became a doubles specialist. In 1987, he teamed-up with Liem Swie King, won the Chinese Taipei, Japan and Indonesia Open's. Hartono shared numerous international men's doubles titles in a relatively brief time period, most of them with Rudy Gunawan, where Hartono played as front player. These included the Indonesia (1989, 1992), Dutch (1989, 1991), Singapore (1990), and Thailand Open (1991). He won the World Badminton Grand Prix (1990), the Southeast Asian Games (1991), the prestigious All-England title (1992), and earned a silver medal at the 1992 Olympics in Barcelona, all with Gunawan. Hartono also captured several international mixed doubles titles, and placed second in mixed doubles at the 1989 IBF World Championships with Verawaty Fadjrin.

Personal life 
Hartono married Yuliani Jusro on 19 April 1992, and the ceremony was held at the Wisma Karsa Pemuda, Senayan, Jakarta. He is now works as commissioner residential area developers in PT. Duta Paramindo Sejahtera.

Achievements

Olympic Games 
Men's doubles

World Championships 
Men's doubles

Mixed doubles

World Cup 
Men's doubles

Mixed doubles

World Masters Games 
Men's doubles

World Senior Championships 

Men's doubles

Asian Games 
Men's doubles

Mixed doubles

Southeast Asian Games 
Men's doubles

Mixed doubles

IBF World Grand Prix 
The World Badminton Grand Prix sanctioned by International Badminton Federation (IBF) from 1983 to 2006.

Men's doubles

Mixed doubles

 IBF Grand Prix tournament
 IBF Grand Prix Finals tournament

IBF International 
Men's doubles

References

External links 
 Eddy HARTONO at InternationalBadminton.org 
 
 KONI profile
 
 

1964 births
Living people
People from Kudus Regency
Sportspeople from Central Java
Indonesian people of Chinese descent
Indonesian male badminton players
Badminton players at the 1992 Summer Olympics
Olympic badminton players of Indonesia
Olympic silver medalists for Indonesia
Olympic medalists in badminton
Medalists at the 1992 Summer Olympics
Badminton players at the 1986 Asian Games
Badminton players at the 1990 Asian Games
Asian Games silver medalists for Indonesia
Asian Games bronze medalists for Indonesia
Asian Games medalists in badminton
Medalists at the 1986 Asian Games
Medalists at the 1990 Asian Games
Southeast Asian Games gold medalists for Indonesia
Southeast Asian Games medalists in badminton
Competitors at the 1987 Southeast Asian Games
Competitors at the 1989 Southeast Asian Games
Competitors at the 1991 Southeast Asian Games
World No. 1 badminton players